Bridge Mountain is a  mountain made of Navajo Sandstone in Zion National Park in Washington County, of southwest Utah, United States.

Description

Bridge Mountain is located east of the park headquarters near the south entrance to Zion Canyon. Bridge Mountain was once originally named Crawford Mountain after the Crawford family who were early Mormon settlers in the canyon. But the name was officially changed to Bridge Mountain in 1934 when a natural bridge was discovered on Bridge Mountain. However, it was not a bridge, but a natural arch. For years, rangers in Zion Park told visitors that this was a natural bridge, hence the mountain's name. A bridge is defined as a subtype of arch that is primarily water-formed. To avoid confusion, the National Park Service eventually named the span Crawford Arch. Precipitation runoff from the mountain drains into tributaries of the North Fork Virgin River. This mountain is composed of Navajo Sandstone, with a red shale outcropping of the Kayenta Formation exposed along the lower slopes.

Climate

Spring and fall are the most favorable seasons to visit Bridge Mountain. According to the Köppen climate classification system, it is located in a Cold semi-arid climate zone, which is defined by the coldest month having an average mean temperature below 32 °F (0 °C), and at least 50% of the total annual precipitation being received during the spring and summer.

Gallery

See also

 Geology of the Zion and Kolob canyons area
 Colorado Plateau

References

External links

 Zion National Park National Park Service
 Weather: Bridge Mountain

Mountains of Utah
Zion National Park
Mountains of Washington County, Utah
North American 2000 m summits
Colorado Plateau